Cystolepiota albogilva is a species of mushroom producing fungus in the family Agaricaceae.

Taxonomy 
It was described in 1989 by the German mycologist Rolf Singer who classified it as Cystolepiota albogilva.

Description 
Cystolepiota albogilva is a small white mushroom with white flesh.

Cap: Up to 1cm wide, convex and flattening with age finally with a slight depression in the centre. The surface is covered with woolly scales (floccosus) which are white at the margins and discolouring yellow towards the centre. Gills: Free, crowded and whitish or pale cream. Stem: 1.5-1.9cm tall and 1-2mm wide.The surface is white and appears smooth and bare but it has a subtle frosted coating that may be more visible with a lens. The stem runs equally to the base where whitish mycelium may be present. There is no stem ring. Spores: Ellipsoidal. Nonamyloid, hyaline or yellowish in KOH. 3.8-5.5 x 2.5 μm. Basidia: 11-13 x 3.5-4.5 μm. Four spored. Smell: Indistinct.

Habitat and distribution 
The specimens studied by Singer were found growing on the ground near Igapó forests in Ponta Negra, Brazil.

References 

Agaricaceae
Fungi described in 1989
Fungi of South America
Taxa named by Rolf Singer